This was the first edition of the tournament.

Julia Grabher won the title, defeating Lucia Bronzetti in the final, 6–2, 6–3.

Seeds
All seeds receive a bye into the second round.

Draw

Finals

Top half

Section 1

Section 2

Bottom half

Section 3

Section 4

References

Draws

Singles